Willis "Spider" Bennett (born August 4, 1943) is a retired American basketball player.

Born in Lakewood Township, New Jersey, Bennett played collegiately for the Winston-Salem State University.

He played for the Dallas Chaparrals and Houston Mavericks (1968–69) in the ABA for 59 games.

References

External links

1943 births
Living people
American men's basketball players
Basketball players from New Jersey
Dallas Chaparrals players
Guards (basketball)
Hartford Capitols players
Houston Mavericks players
Sportspeople from Lakewood Township, New Jersey
Winston-Salem State Rams men's basketball players